Jarosław Fojut (born 17 October 1987) is a Polish former professional footballer. He currently serves as the sporting director of Stal Rzeszów.

Fojut began his career in England, where he played for Bolton Wanderers and also spent time on loan with Luton Town and Stockport County. He subsequently returned to Poland with Śląsk Wrocław and also played for Tromsø IL in Norway and Dundee United in Scotland prior to joining Pogoń Szczecin in 2015. He has also competed at youth international level up to the Poland under-23 team.

Club career

Bolton
Fojut was born in Legionowo, Masovian Voivodeship. He joined Bolton Wanderers in 2004. The defender made his first senior appearance for Bolton as a substitute (to replace Khalilou Fadiga), during the FA Cup Third Round 3–0 victory against Watford at Vicarage Road in 2006. His Premier League debut came in the 1–1 draw against Portsmouth at Fratton Park. He made a total of four appearances for the first team, as well as becoming captain of the reserve team.

Luton (loan)
On 31 August 2007, he joined League One side Luton Town on loan until 1 January 2008. He made his debut for Luton in the Football League Trophy match against Northampton Town on 4 September. He scored his first goal on 27 November in a 2–0 away win against Brentford in the FA Cup and followed that up a week later with his first league goal in a 1–1 tie away to Oldham Athletic. He scored his third and final goal for Luton in a 2–1 win over Port Vale on 29 December 2007.

Fojut garnered much praise during his loan spell, Luton manager Kevin Blackwell describing the young defender's performances as "colossal", however, his stay could not be extended, with all loan players being required to return to their parent clubs when Luton was placed in administration.

He returned to Bolton Wanderers and over the summer underwent an operation to resolve a long-standing hernia problem.

Stockport County (loan)

On 9 October 2008, Fojut began a one-month loan spell at Stockport County in League One, where he managed just three games due to a hamstring problem.

Śląsk Wrocław

On 11 February 2009, Fojut signed a three-and-a-half-year contract with Śląsk Wrocław in the Polish Ekstraklasa. On 17 January 2012, Fojut signed a pre-contract agreement with Scottish Premier League club Celtic. Fojut was due to join the club at the start of the 2012–13 Scottish Premier League season, but he suffered a cruciate knee ligament injury while playing for Śląsk Wrocław. Celtic then decided to cancel their contract offer to Fojut.

Tromsø IL

On 11 December 2012 the player and his agents were observed in Tromsø, Norway for negotiations with Tippeligaen club Tromsø IL. On 21 December the club could inform the public that an agreement for 2.5 years had been reached with Fojut. While warming up ahead of the league-match against Strømsgodset on 29 June 2013, Fojut crashed with an advertising board and broke his nose and was unable to play the match. He was released by Tromsø in the summer of 2014 and subsequently joined Scottish club Dundee United.

Dundee United
On 14 July 2014, Fojut signed a two-year contract with Scottish Premiership side Dundee United. He made his debut on 10 August 2014, in a 3–0 win against Aberdeen.
He scored his first goal for the club later that month in another 3–0 win, this time against St Mirren.

Pogoń Szczecin
Fojut returned to Poland in June 2015, signing a three-year contract with Ekstraklasa club Pogoń Szczecin.

Wisła Płock
On 10 June 2019 it was confirmed, that Fojut joined Wisła Płock. He only made 3 league and 2 Cup appearances for Wisła in the 2019–20 season.

Stal Rzeszów
On 11 September 2020 he signed a two-year contract with a third-tier club Stal Rzeszów. He retired after the 2020–21 season and was appointed as Stal's new sporting director.

International career
Fojut has represented Poland at U-19 and U-20 level, where he made appearances at the 2006 UEFA European Under-19 Championship and the 2007 FIFA U-20 World Cup.

Career statistics

References

External links

1987 births
Living people
People from Legionowo
Sportspeople from Masovian Voivodeship
Polish footballers
Poland youth international footballers
Association football defenders
Bolton Wanderers F.C. players
Luton Town F.C. players
Stockport County F.C. players
Śląsk Wrocław players
Tromsø IL players
Dundee United F.C. players
Pogoń Szczecin players
Wisła Płock players
Stal Rzeszów players
Premier League players
English Football League players
Ekstraklasa players
II liga players
Eliteserien players
Scottish Professional Football League players
Polish expatriate footballers
Expatriate footballers in England
Expatriate footballers in Norway
Expatriate footballers in Scotland
Polish expatriate sportspeople in England
Polish expatriate sportspeople in Norway
Polish expatriate sportspeople in Scotland